

Azerbaijan Premier League 2017-18

Gabala

In:

Out:

Kapaz

In:

Out:

Keşla

In:

Out:

Neftchi Baku

In:

Out:

Qarabağ

In:

Out:

Sabail

In:

Out:

Sumgayit

In:

Out:

Zira 

In:

Out:

References

Azerbaijan
Azerbaijani football transfer lists
2017–18 in Azerbaijani football